The genus Pan consists of two extant species: the chimpanzee and the bonobo. Taxonomically, these two ape species are collectively termed panins; however, both species are more commonly referred to collectively using the generalized term chimpanzees, or chimps. Together with humans, gorillas, and orangutans they are part of the family Hominidae (the great apes, or hominids).  Native to sub-Saharan Africa, chimpanzees and bonobos are currently both found in the Congo jungle, while only the chimpanzee is also found further north in West Africa. Both species are listed as endangered on the IUCN Red List of Threatened Species, and in 2017 the Convention on Migratory Species selected the chimpanzee for special protection.

Chimpanzee and bonobo: comparison 
The chimpanzee (P. troglodytes) who lives north of the Congo River, and the bonobo (P. paniscus) who lives south of it, were once considered to be the same species, but since 1928 they have been recognized as distinct. In addition, P. troglodytes is divided into four subspecies, while P. paniscus is undivided. Based on genome sequencing, these two extant Pan species diverged around one million years ago.

The most obvious differences are that chimpanzees are somewhat larger, more aggressive and male-dominated, while the bonobos are more gracile, peaceful, and female-dominated. Their hair is typically black or brown. Males and females differ in size and appearance. Both chimpanzees and bonobos are some of the most social great apes, with social bonds occurring throughout large communities. Fruit is the most important component of a chimpanzee's diet; but they will also eat vegetation, bark, honey, insects and even other chimpanzees or monkeys. They can live over 30 years in both the wild and captivity.

Chimpanzees and bonobos are equally humanity's closest living relatives. As such, they are among the largest-brained and most intelligent primates: they use a variety of sophisticated tools and construct elaborate sleeping nests each night from branches and foliage. Their learning abilities have been extensively studied. There may even be distinctive cultures within populations. Field studies of Pan troglodytes were pioneered by primatologist Jane Goodall. Both Pan species are considered to be endangered as human activities have caused severe declines in the populations and ranges of both species. Threats to wild panina populations include poaching, habitat destruction, and the illegal pet trade. Several conservation and rehabilitation organisations are dedicated to the survival of Pan species in the wild.

Names
The genus name Pan was first introduced by Lorenz Oken in 1816. An alternative Theranthropus was suggested by Brookes 1828 and Chimpansee by Voigt 1831. Troglodytes was not available, as it had been given as the name of a genus of wren in 1809, for "cave-dweller", reflecting the tendency of some wrens to forage in dark crevices. The International Commission on Zoological Nomenclature adopted Pan as the only official name of the genus in 1895, though the "cave-dweller" connection was able to be included, albeit at the species level (Pan troglodytes – the common chimpanzee) for one of the two species of Pan. The genus name is a reference to Pan, the Greek god of nature and wilderness.

The first use of the name "chimpanze" is recorded in The London Magazine in 1738, glossed as meaning "mockman" in a language of "the Angolans" (apparently from a Bantu language; reportedly modern Vili (Civili), a Zone H Bantu language, has the comparable ci-mpenzi). The spelling chimpanzee is found in a 1758 supplement to Chamber's Cyclopædia. The colloquialism "chimp" was most likely coined some time in the late 1870s.

The chimpanzee was named Simia troglodytes by Johann Friedrich Blumenbach in 1776. The species name troglodytes is a reference to the Troglodytae (literally "cave-goers"), an African people described by Greco-Roman geographers. Blumenbach first used it in his De generis humani varietate nativa liber ("On the natural varieties of the human genus") in 1776, Linnaeus 1758 had already used Homo troglodytes for a hypothetical mixture of human and orangutan.

The bonobo, in the past also referred to as the "pygmy chimpanzee", was given the species name of paniscus by Ernst Schwarz (1929), a diminutive of the theonym Pan.

Distribution and habitat
There are two species of the genus Pan, both previously called simply chimpanzees:  
 Chimpanzees or Pan troglodytes, are found almost exclusively in the heavily forested regions of Central and West Africa. With at least four commonly accepted subspecies, their population and distribution is much more extensive than the Bonobos, in the past also called 'Pygmy Chimpanzee'.  
 Bonobos, Pan paniscus, are found only in Central Africa, south of the Congo River and north of the Kasai River (a tributary of the Congo), in the humid forest of the Democratic Republic of Congo of Central Africa.

Evolutionary history

Evolutionary relationship

The genus Pan is part of the subfamily Homininae, to which humans also belong. The lineages of chimpanzees and humans separated in a process of speciation between roughly five to twelve million years ago, making them humanity's closest living relative. Research by Mary-Claire King in 1973 found 99% identical DNA between human beings and chimpanzees. For some time, research modified that finding to about 94% commonality, with some of the difference occurring in noncoding DNA, but more recent knowledge states the difference in DNA between humans, chimpanzees and bonobos at just about 1%–1.2% again.

Fossils
The chimpanzee fossil record has long been absent and thought to have been due to the preservation bias in relation to their environment. However, in 2005, chimpanzee fossils were discovered and described by Sally McBrearty and colleagues. Existing chimpanzee populations in West and Central Africa are separate from the major human fossil sites in East Africa; however, chimpanzee fossils have been reported from Kenya, indicating that both humans and members of the Pan clade were present in the East African Rift Valley during the Middle Pleistocene.

Anatomy and physiology

The chimpanzee's arms are longer than its legs. Male adult wild chimps weigh between 40 and 60 kg with females weighing between 27 and 50 kg. When extended, the common chimp's long arms span one and a half times the body's height. The bonobo is slightly shorter and thinner than the common chimpanzee, but has longer limbs. In trees, both species climb with their long, powerful arms; on the ground, chimpanzees usually knuckle-walk, or walk on all fours, clenching their fists and supporting themselves on the knuckles. Chimpanzees are better suited for walking than orangutans, because the chimp's feet have broader soles and shorter toes. The bonobo has proportionately longer upper limbs and walks upright more often than does the common chimpanzee. Both species can walk upright on two legs when carrying objects with their hands and arms.

The chimpanzee is tailless; its coat is dark; its face, fingers, palms of the hands, and soles of the feet are hairless. The exposed skin of the face, hands, and feet varies from pink to very dark in both species, but is generally lighter in younger individuals and darkens with maturity. A University of Chicago Medical Centre study has found significant genetic differences between chimpanzee populations. A bony shelf over the eyes gives the forehead a receding appearance, and the nose is flat. Although the jaws protrude, a chimp's lips are thrust out only when it pouts.

The brain of a chimpanzee has been measured at a general range of 282–500 cm3. The human brain, in contrast, is about three times larger, with a reported average volume of about 1330 cm3.

Chimpanzees reach puberty between the age of eight and ten years. A chimpanzee's testicles are unusually large for its body size, with a combined weight of about  compared to a gorilla's  or a human's . This relatively great size is generally attributed to sperm competition due to the polygynandrous nature of chimpanzee mating behaviour.

Longevity
In the wild, chimpanzees live to their 30s, while some captured chimps have reached an age of 70 years and older.

Muscle strength

Chimpanzees are known for possessing great amount of muscle strength, especially in their arms. However, compared to humans the amount of strength reported in media and popular science is greatly exaggerated with numbers of four to eight times the muscle strength of a human. These numbers stem from two studies in 1923 and 1926 by a biologist named John Bauman. These studies were refuted in 1943 and an adult male chimpanzee was found to pull about the same weight as an adult man. Corrected for their smaller body sizes, chimpanzees were found to be stronger than humans but not anywhere near four to eight times. In the 1960s these tests were repeated and chimpanzees were found to have twice the strength of a human when it came to pulling weights. The reason for the higher strength seen in chimpanzees compared to humans are thought to come from longer skeletal muscle fibers that can generate twice the work output over a wider range of motion compared to skeletal muscle fibers in humans.

Behaviour
It is suspected that human observers can influence chimpanzee behaviour.  For this reason researchers sometimes prefer camera traps and remote microphones rather than human observers.

Chimpanzee vs. bonobo

Anatomical differences between the common chimpanzee and the bonobo are slight. Both are omnivorous adapted to a mainly frugivorous diet. Yet sexual and social behaviours are markedly different. The common chimpanzee has a troop culture based on beta males led by an alpha male, and highly complex social relationships. The bonobo, on the other hand, has egalitarian, nonviolent, matriarchal, sexually receptive behaviour. Bonobos frequently have sex, sometimes to help prevent and resolve conflicts. Different groups of chimpanzees also have different cultural behaviour with preferences for types of tools. The common chimpanzee tends to display greater aggression than does the bonobo. The average captive chimpanzee sleeps 9 hours and 42 minutes per day.

Contrary to what the scientific name (Pan troglodytes) may suggest, chimpanzees do not typically spend their time in caves, but there have been reports of some of them seeking refuge in caves because of the heat during daytime.

Chimpanzees

Social structure

Chimpanzees live in large multi-male and multi-female social groups, which are called communities. Within a community, the position of an individual and the influence the individual has on others dictates a definite social hierarchy. Chimpanzees live in a leaner hierarchy wherein more than one individual may be dominant enough to dominate other members of lower rank. Typically, a dominant male is referred to as the alpha male. The alpha male is the highest-ranking male that controls the group and maintains order during disputes. In chimpanzee society, the 'dominant male' sometimes is not the largest or strongest male but rather the most manipulative and political male that can influence the goings on within a group. Male chimpanzees typically attain dominance by cultivating allies who will support that individual during future ambitions for power. The alpha male regularly displays by puffing his normally slim coat up to increase view size and charge to seem as threatening and as powerful as possible; this behaviour serves to intimidate other members and thereby maintain power and authority, and it may be fundamental to the alpha male's holding on to his status. Lower-ranking chimpanzees will show respect by submissively gesturing in body language or reaching out their hands while grunting. Female chimpanzees will show deference to the alpha male by presenting their hindquarters.

Female chimpanzees also have a hierarchy, which is influenced by the position of a female individual within a group. In some chimpanzee communities, the young females may inherit high status from a high-ranking mother. Dominant females will also ally to dominate lower-ranking females: whereas males mainly seek dominant status for its associated mating privileges and sometimes violent domination of subordinates, females seek dominant status to acquire resources such as food, as high-ranking females often have first access to them. Both genders acquire dominant status to improve social standing within a group.

Community female acceptance is necessary for alpha male status; females must ensure that their group visits places that supply them with enough food. A group of dominant females will sometimes oust an alpha male which is not to their preference and back another male, in whom they see potential for leading the group as a successful alpha male.

The mating system within each community is polygynandrous, with each male and female possibly having multiple sexual partners.

Intelligence

Chimpanzees make tools and use them to acquire foods and for social displays; they have sophisticated hunting strategies requiring cooperation, influence and rank; they are status conscious, manipulative and capable of deception; they can learn to use symbols and understand aspects of human language including some relational syntax, concepts of number and numerical sequence; and they are capable of spontaneous planning for a future state or event.

Tool use

In October 1960, Jane Goodall observed the use of tools among chimpanzees. Recent research indicates that chimpanzees' use of stone tools dates back at least 4,300 years (about 2,300 BC). One example of chimpanzee tool usage behavior includes the use of a large stick as a tool to dig into termite mounds, and the subsequent use of a small stick altered into a tool that is used to "fish" the termites out of the mound. Chimpanzees are also known to use smaller stones as hammers and a large one as an anvil in order to break open nuts.

In the 1970s, reports of chimpanzees using rocks or sticks as weapons were anecdotal and controversial. However, a 2007 study claimed to reveal the use of spears, which common chimpanzees in Senegal sharpen with their teeth and use to stab and pry Senegal bushbabies out of small holes in trees.

Prior to the discovery of tool use by chimpanzees, humans were believed to be the only species to make and use tools; however, several other tool-using species are now known.

Nest-building
Nest-building, sometimes considered to be a form of tool use, is seen when chimpanzees construct arboreal night nests by lacing together branches from one or more trees to build a safe, comfortable place to sleep; infants learn this process by watching their mothers. Both day and night nests are built, and may be located in groups. A study in 2014 found that the muhimbi tree is favoured for nest building by chimpanzees in Uganda due to its physical properties, such as bending strength, inter-node distance, and leaf surface area.

Altruism and emotivity

Studies have shown chimpanzees engage in apparently altruistic behaviour within groups. Some researchers have suggested that chimpanzees are indifferent to the welfare of unrelated group members, but a more recent study of wild chimpanzees found that both male and female adults would adopt orphaned young of their group. Also, different groups sometimes share food, form coalitions, and cooperate in hunting and border patrolling. Sometimes, chimpanzees have adopted young that come from unrelated groups. And in some rare cases, even male chimpanzees have been shown to take care of abandoned infant chimpanzees of an unrelated group, though in most cases they would kill the infant.

According to a literature summary by James W. Harrod, evidence for chimpanzee emotivity includes display of mourning; "incipient romantic love"; "rain dances"; appreciation of natural beauty (such as a sunset over a lake); curiosity and respect towards other wildlife (such as the python, which is neither a threat nor a food source to chimpanzees); altruism toward other species (such as feeding turtles); and animism, or "pretend play", when chimpanzees cradle and groom rocks or sticks.

Communication between chimpanzees

Chimpanzees communicate in a manner that is similar to that of human nonverbal communication, using vocalizations, hand gestures, and facial expressions. There is some evidence that they can recreate human speech. Research into the chimpanzee brain has revealed that when chimpanzees communicate, an area in the brain is activated which is in the same position as the language center called Broca's area in human brains.

Aggression

Adult common chimpanzees, particularly males, can be very aggressive. They are highly territorial and are known to kill others of their species.

Hunting

Chimpanzees also engage in targeted hunting of smaller primates, such as the red colobus and bush babies. Males who acquire the meat may share it with females to have sex or for grooming.

Puzzle solving

In February 2013, a study found that chimpanzees solve puzzles for entertainment.

Chimpanzees in human history

Chimpanzees, as well as other apes, had also been purported to have been known to ancient writers, but mainly as myths and legends on the edge of European and Near Eastern societal consciousness. Apes are mentioned variously by Aristotle. The English word ape translates Hebrew qőf in English translations of the Bible (1 Kings 10:22), but the word may refer to a monkey rather than an ape proper.

The diary of Portuguese explorer Duarte Pacheco Pereira (1506), preserved in the Portuguese National Archive (Torre do Tombo), is probably the first written document to acknowledge that chimpanzees built their own rudimentary tools. The first of these early transcontinental chimpanzees came from Angola and were presented as a gift to Frederick Henry, Prince of Orange in 1640, and were followed by a few of its brethren over the next several years. Scientists described these first chimpanzees as "pygmies", and noted the animals' distinct similarities to humans. The next two decades, a number of the creatures were imported into Europe, mainly acquired by various zoological gardens as entertainment for visitors.

Charles Darwin's theory of natural selection (published in 1859) spurred scientific interest in chimpanzees, as in much of life science, leading eventually to numerous studies of the animals in the wild and captivity. The observers of chimpanzees at the time were mainly interested in behaviour as it related to that of humans. This was less strictly and disinterestedly scientific than it might sound, with much attention being focused on whether or not the animals had traits that could be considered 'good'; the intelligence of chimpanzees was often significantly exaggerated, as immortalized in Hugo Rheinhold's Affe mit Schädel (see image, left). By the end of the 19th century, chimpanzees remained very much a mystery to humans, with very little factual scientific information available.

In the 20th century, a new age of scientific research into chimpanzee behaviour began. Before 1960, almost nothing was known about chimpanzee behaviour in their natural habitats. In July of that year, Jane Goodall set out to Tanzania's Gombe forest to live among the chimpanzees, where she primarily studied the members of the Kasakela chimpanzee community. Her discovery that chimpanzees made and used tools was groundbreaking, as humans were previously believed to be the only species to do so. The most progressive early studies on chimpanzees were spearheaded primarily by Wolfgang Köhler and Robert Yerkes, both of whom were renowned psychologists. Both men and their colleagues established laboratory studies of chimpanzees focused specifically on learning about the intellectual abilities of chimpanzees, particularly problem-solving. This typically involved basic, practical tests on laboratory chimpanzees, which required a fairly high intellectual capacity (such as how to solve the problem of acquiring an out-of-reach banana). Notably, Yerkes also made extensive observations of chimpanzees in the wild which added tremendously to the scientific understanding of chimpanzees and their behaviour. Yerkes studied chimpanzees until World War II, while Köhler concluded five years of study and published his famous Mentality of Apes in 1925 (which is coincidentally when Yerkes began his analyses), eventually concluding, "chimpanzees manifest intelligent behaviour of the general kind familiar in human beings ... a type of behaviour which counts as specifically human" (1925).

The August 2008 issue of the American Journal of Primatology reported results of a year-long study of chimpanzees in Tanzania's Mahale Mountains National Park, which produced evidence of chimpanzees becoming sick from viral infectious diseases they had likely contracted from humans. Molecular, microscopic and epidemiological investigations demonstrated the chimpanzees living at Mahale Mountains National Park have been suffering from a respiratory disease that is likely caused by a variant of a human paramyxovirus.

Conservation

The US Fish and Wildlife Service finalized a rule on June 12, 2015, creating very strict regulations, practically barring any activity with chimpanzees other than for scientific, preservation-oriented purposes.

See also

 Anthropopithecus
 Bili ape
 Chimp Haven
 Chimpanzee genome project
 Dian Fossey
 Great ape personhood
 Jane Goodall
 List of apes
 Monkey Day
 Prostitution among animals#Chimpanzees
 The Third Chimpanzee

Notes

References

Further reading
 Hawks, John. "How Strong Is a Chimpanzee?". Slate. February 25, 2009.
 Pickrell, John. (September 24, 2002). "Humans, Chimps Not as Closely Related as Thought?". National Geographic. Archived September 7, 2017. 
 Zimmer, Carl. "On the Origin of Humans' Generosity". The New York Times. September 11, 2018.

External links

 
 
 
 
Stanford, Craig B. The Predatory Behavior and Ecology of Wild Chimpanzees  university of Southern California. 2002(?)
 ChimpCARE.org
 
 Human Timeline (Interactive) – Smithsonian, National Museum of Natural History (August 2016).

 
 
Articles containing video clips
Extant Pliocene first appearances
Primates of Africa
Tool-using mammals
Taxa named by Lorenz Oken
Taxa described in 1816
Primate genera

ln:Mokómbósó
nn:Sjimpanse
th:ลิงชิมแปนซี